Emmelie Scholtens (born 27 October 1985) is a Dutch dressage rider. She competed at the 2018 World Equestrian Games in Tryon and at the 2019 European Championships in Rotterdam were she won the silver medal with the Dutch team. She also won several medals at the World Championships for Young Dressage Horses. In 2019 she competed at the World Cup finals in Goteborg, Sweden with Apache.

Biography
Emmelie Scholtens is born in Groningen as a daughter of the famous Dutch breeder Thea Moerkert. All that Emmelie could walk she could already ride. She started working professionally in the horses at Stal Laarakkers but moved in 2009 to Stal Witte in Schijndel. Here she met her current partner Jeroen Witte. Currently, they are running a dressage stable in Gorinchem, The Netherlands.

Achievements
 Gold at the 2009 World Championships for Young Horses in Verden with Westpoint by the six-years-old division
 Gold at the 2010 World Championships for Young Horses in Verden with Astrix by the five-years-old division
 Gold at the 2011 World Championships for Young Horses in Verden with Astrix by the six-years-old division
 Silver at the 2012 World Championships for Young Horses in Verden with Borencio by the six-years-old division
 Bronze at the 2013 World Championships for Young Horses in Verden with Dorado by the five-years-old division

References 

Living people
1985 births
Dutch dressage riders
Dutch female equestrians
Sportspeople from Groningen (city)
21st-century Dutch women